Serra da Bocaina National Park is a national park of Brazil. It is located at the border between the states of Rio de Janeiro and São Paulo in southeastern Brazil.

Location

The park headquarters is located in São José do Barreiro, the State of São Paulo. It is administered by the Chico Mendes Institute for Biodiversity Conservation (ICMBio). It is estimated that 60% of the vegetation is composed of native Atlantic Forest, and the rest is forest regenerated (secondary) for over 30 years.

The park is part of the  Bocaina Mosaic, created in 2006.

Biota
Among the species of flora are pines, cedars, trumpet trees, palm trees and bromeliads.  Among the fauna of the park are cats, sloths, deer, monkeys, snakes and birds.

A number of amphibians are only known from the park and its buffer area: Brachycephalus vertebralis, Ischnocnema pusilla, Bokermannohyla ahenea, Bokermannohyla clepsydra, Scinax ariadne, Megaelosia bocainensis, Physalaemus barrioi, and Paratelmatobius gaigeae.

About 294 species of birds have been recorded in the park, coupled with its extension and state of preservation, are ideal conditions for birdwatching activity. Among the most common bird species are the yellow-bellied murucutu, the tern, the blue-billed black maria.

See also 

 Três Pontas Mountains

References

Sources

National parks of Brazil
Protected areas of Rio de Janeiro (state)
Protected areas of São Paulo (state)
Protected areas of the Atlantic Forest